Germán Darío Lux (born 7 June 1982) is a retired Argentine professional footballer who last played for River Plate as a goalkeeper.

After starting out at River Plate, he spent most of his career in Spain with Mallorca and Deportivo.

Club career
Lux was born in Carcarañá, Santa Fe Province. Nicknamed Poroto, he joined Club Atlético River Plate's youth ranks aged 16, and made his Primera División debut in 2001. Shortly after, he became first choice.

In the 2006 Apertura, Lux lost his job to emergent talent Juan Pablo Carrizo and, a few months after, was cut from the squad by coach Daniel Passarella. In the beginning of the year he also lost his brother, who committed suicide.

Lux signed a four-year deal with RCD Mallorca for the 2007–08 season, as a backup to youth graduate Miguel Ángel Moyá, but benefitted from an injury to the latter to appear in ten La Liga matches during the campaign. In his second year, the same occurred: Moyá was again downed with physical problems and Lux was promoted to starter, but lost his job in January 2009 with the signing of Dudu Aouate from Deportivo de La Coruña.

In the following two seasons, Lux was almost exclusively restricted to Copa del Rey matches with Mallorca, only making a total of five league appearances. The same fate befell him in his next club, Deportivo La Coruña, where he played second-fiddle to Dani Aranzubia for two years.

On 26 June 2017, ten years after leaving for Europe, the 35-year-old Lux returned to River Plate on a three-year contract.

International career
As a starter (all six matches, no goals conceded) during the 2004 Summer Olympics, Lux was instrumental in the gold medal triumph of the Argentina national team, which netted 17. During the 2005 FIFA Confederations Cup, however, he had a poor performance with the full side.

Lux was left out of the squad for the 2006 FIFA World Cup in Germany, and Óscar Ustari was picked instead.

Personal life
Lux's older brother, Javier, was also a footballer. A midfielder, he played for several teams during his career.

Career statistics

Club

Honours
River Plate
Argentine Primera División: 2002 Clausura, 2004 Clausura
Copa Libertadores: 2018
Recopa Sudamericana: 2019

Deportivo
Segunda División: 2011–12

Argentina Youth
FIFA U-20 World Cup: 2001
Summer Olympic Games: 2004
CONMEBOL Pre-Olympic Tournament: 2004

References

External links
Deportivo official profile 
Argentine League statistics  

1982 births
Living people
People from San Lorenzo Department
Argentine people of French descent
Argentine footballers
Association football goalkeepers
Argentine Primera División players
Club Atlético River Plate footballers
La Liga players
Segunda División players
RCD Mallorca players
Deportivo de La Coruña players
Argentina under-20 international footballers
Argentina international footballers
2005 FIFA Confederations Cup players
Olympic footballers of Argentina
Footballers at the 2004 Summer Olympics
Olympic medalists in football
Medalists at the 2004 Summer Olympics
Olympic gold medalists for Argentina
Argentine expatriate footballers
Expatriate footballers in Spain
Argentine expatriate sportspeople in Spain
Sportspeople from Santa Fe Province